This is a list of episodes of the South Korean variety-music show King of Mask Singer. The show airs on MBC as part of their Sunday Night lineup.

Overview

2015

2016

2017

2018

2019

2020

2021

2022

2023

Notes

References

Lists of South Korean television series episodes